Scopula lydia is a species of moth of the family Geometridae. It was described by Arthur Gardiner Butler in 1886. It is endemic to Australia.

References

Moths described in 1886
Moths of Australia
lydia
Taxa named by Arthur Gardiner Butler